Gigantes de Carolina is the professional female volleyball team of Carolina, Puerto Rico.

History
The team was found in 2002.

Squads

Previous

Current

As of April 2011
 Head Coach:  Javier Gaspar
 Assistant coach:  Angel Peña

Release or Transfer

Palmares

League Championship 
 2003, 2004 and 2006

References

External links
 League Official website
 Team website 

Puerto Rican volleyball clubs
Volleyball clubs established in 2002